Princess Suchitra Bharani or Phra Chao Boromwongse Ther Phra Ong Chao Suchitra Bharani (RTGS: Suchittra Phorani) (6 February 1890 – 26 October 1918), was the Princess of Siam (later Thailand. She was a member of Siamese Royal Family. She is a daughter of Chulalongkorn, King Rama V of Siam.

Her mother was Chao Chom Manda Chum Krairoek, daughter of Lord (Phra) Mangkalaratana Rajamontri. She had an elder sister, Princess Adorndibyanibha. She died on 27 October 1918, at the age of only 28 years 8 months.

Ancestry

References 

1890 births
1918 deaths
19th-century Thai women
19th-century Chakri dynasty
20th-century Thai women
20th-century Chakri dynasty
Thai female Phra Ong Chao
Dames Grand Commander of the Order of Chula Chom Klao
Children of Chulalongkorn
Daughters of kings